WBFO (88.7 FM) is the NPR member station for Buffalo, New York, carrying an almost entirely public news/talk format. It broadcasts from studios in the Lower Terrace section of downtown Buffalo which it shares with WNED-TV and WNED-FM.  Previously, it broadcast from the South campus (a.k.a. Main Street Campus) of the University at Buffalo.  It currently leases an as-yet unutilized satellite studio in Toronto, Ontario, Canada. WBFO runs two permanent satellite stations: WUBJ (88.1 FM) in Jamestown, New York, and WOLN (91.3 FM) in Olean, New York, along with a digital audio simulcast on the second audio program of WNED-DT4.

WBFO is owned, along with the WNED stations, by the Western New York Public Broadcasting Association, which does business as Buffalo Toronto Public Media.

History

WBFO was founded in 1959 as a public radio station owned and operated by the State University of New York at Buffalo (UB). For many years prior to selling to its current owners, UB operated WBFO as a jazz station, programming National Public Radio's drive time programs Morning Edition and All Things Considered while carrying locally programmed jazz during the midday, evening and overnight hours, with blues music and specialty programming on weekends.

UB was one of two public broadcasting organizations active in Western New York at the time, the other being the Western New York Public Broadcasting Association, whose AM, FM and TV stations all carried the call sign WNED and which carried no direct affiliation with any university or government entity. WNED's AM station, AM 970, was an all-spoken word format that duplicated coverage of Morning Edition and All Things Considered, along with some other spoken-word programming, with WBFO. By 2010, UB had eliminated the daytime and much of the evening music programming as merger discussions with WNED began.

WNED purchased WBFO in July 2011 and incorporated some of the channel's news features and staff into a combined lineup on March 1, 2012, through November 30, 2012 (when the sale of WNED to Crawford Broadcasting was finalized and the call letters changed to WDCZ) which it broadcast on both stations. All of the network music programming WBFO had carried on weekends was dropped. Most of the spoken word programming lost in the merger formerly aired on WNED (although much of that was restored after Talk of the Nation, previously a WBFO exclusive, ended its run, and additional slots were opened when Car Talk was dropped in 2017). Among the programs eliminated from the old WBFO were the last jazz programs originating from a Buffalo area radio station at that time; jazz would eventually return as part of the broad-based standards format on the revived WEBR in 2020.

WBFO, along with WNED-FM-TV, began collectively referring to themselves as "Buffalo Toronto Public Media" on February 4, 2020. The rebranding was in part to better identify WBFO and the WNED stations as part of a single organization; it also reflects WNED-TV's significant Canadian viewership and financial support, though WNED officials told The Buffalo News that the organization's radio stations have minimal listenership in Canada.

Programming

Prior to March 2012, WBFO presented a full-service mix of news and music programming that incorporated blues and jazz.  WBFO's local news department had been highly recognized by the New York State Associated Press Broadcasters Association.  WBFO was all-news during the day and featured jazz overnight. On weekends there had been a mix of syndicated talk programs (such as Car Talk, Only a Game and Wait Wait... Don't Tell Me!) mornings, and music programs (The Thistle & Shamrock, Bebop and Beyond, and Piano Jazz) in the evenings. Locally originated blues programming was broadcast on Saturday and Sunday afternoons.

A four-hour block of jazz programming during the midday shift was eliminated in 2010, with Fresh Air moving to an earlier time slot and additional talk programming (all network or syndicated) added. The program changes also eliminated an additional two hours of jazz and local music in the evening time slot, pushing the start of jazz programming from 8 p.m. back to 10 p.m., being replaced by replays of programming that had already aired on WBFO earlier in the day.

All remaining local and syndicated music programming on WBFO, with the exception of the weekend afternoon blues blocks which were moved to evenings were eliminated on March 1, 2012, after WNED took over WBFO's operations; the only music programming on either WNED or WBFO were the blues blocks and A Prairie Home Companion, which had previously aired on WNED. (The latter show ended in 2016 with Garrison Keillor's retirement; neither WBFO nor WNED carried the successor program Live from Here, which ran until 2020.)

HD Radio programming
A musical satellite feed called Exponential which had been carried on the HD2 channel was replaced by a satellite jazz feed called JazzWorks. In November 2021, JazzWorks was moved to WNED-FM-HD2 to make way for "The Bridge," an adult album alternative format. A third channel, HD3, consisting of NPR news and information which allowed the listening of programs at times they were not on the main channel, was eliminated when JazzWorks was added.

See also
 WDCZ
 WNED-FM

References

External links
 WBFO Official website

 WNED, WBFO's parent organization

1959 establishments in New York (state)
NPR member stations
Radio stations established in 1959
BFO
News and talk radio stations in the United States